Go!!GO!GO!Go!! is the eighth studio album by Japanese rock band GO!GO!7188.

Track listing

External links 
 GO!GO!7188 Discography at FlyingStar Records (Japanese)

2010 albums
GO!GO!7188 albums